The Women's Individual Road Race at the 1996 UCI Road World Championships was held in October 1996 in Lugano, Switzerland, over a total distance of 100.8 kilometres.

Final classification

References
Results

Women's Road Race
UCI Road World Championships – Women's road race
UCI